To the Death is the sixth studio album by American metalcore band Earth Crisis. It is the band's first album since they reunited in 2007. It is also their first recording for major label Century Media, released on April 20, 2009 in Europe and May 5, 2009 in North America.

Critical reception 
To the Death received generally positive reviews from music critics.

Track listing

Personnel
 Karl Buechner - vocals
 Scott Crouse - guitar
 Erick Edwards - guitar
 Ian "Bulldog" Edwards - bass
 Dennis Merrick - drums

References

Earth Crisis albums
2009 albums
Century Media Records albums